Eastern Aid (Osthilfe) was a policy of the German Government of the Weimar Republic (1919–33) to give financial support from Government funds to bankrupt estates in East Prussia.

The policy was implemented beginning in 1929–1930, in spite of the generally dire economic situation and the lack of government funds, because of the overwhelming need of the Government of the German Republic to retain the support of the influential Junker owners of these estates, although it was opposed by such important politicians as general and Chancellor of Germany Kurt von Schleicher.

This policy produced a major scandal in Germany in December 1932 and January 1933, the Osthilfeskandal. A considerable number of Junkers were found out to have wasted the money on what was considered to be luxury items, such as cars and vacations. The ensuing investigations into the scandal also implicated the President of the Republic, General Paul von Hindenburg. It came to light that the Hindenburg family's highly indebted estate in East Prussia at Neudeck (owned by the president's brother) had been clandestinely bought in 1927 by a number of industrialists and given to the president as a gift, seemingly in exchange for political influence, and that the property had been registered in Hindenburg's son's name, apparently to evade estate taxes. The recipients of the aid, including some of Hindenburg's close friends, were upset by the government's failure to cover up the scandal, as was Hindenburg himself, so that Chancellor Kurt von Schleicher lost influence on Hindenburg as a result.

After the donation of a further  to this property, and after the Nazis came to power, the matter ceased to command attention in the censored press of the Third Reich.

References 

Politics of the Weimar Republic
Economy of the Weimar Republic
1929 in Germany
1930 in Germany
Free State of Prussia